Vol. 4: Slaves of Fear (stylized as VOL4 ⸬ SLAVES OF FEAR) is the fourth studio album by American noise rock band Health. It was released on February 8, 2019 through Loma Vista Recordings.

Track listing

Charts

References

2019 albums
Health (band) albums
Albums produced by Lars Stalfors
Loma Vista Recordings albums